Larimichthys crocea, commonly called the  large yellow croaker, yellow croaker or croceine croaker, is a species of saltwater fish in the family Sciaenidae, native to the marginal seas of East Asia from western Japan and Korea to the Yellow Sea, East China Sea, Taiwan Strait and northern South China Sea. It generally thrives in temperate coastal waters and often also in brackish estuaries, and is found on muddy-sandy bottoms.

Once an abundant commercial fish off East and South China, Taiwan, South Korea and Japan, its population collapsed in the 1970s due to overfishing. Fishing boats landed 56,000 tonnes of Larimichthys crocea in 2008, and 91,000 tonnes in 2013. The species is now aquafarmed in China, and production has grown to 105,000 tonnes by 2013. Farms have experienced outbreaks of Nocardia seriolae infections.

L. crocea is an important enough commercial species to have its genome mapped in 2014. On 6 January 2015 it became the 200th organism to have its genome annotated by the NCBI Eukaryotic Genome Annotation Pipeline.

References

Sciaenidae
Commercial fish
Fish of the Pacific Ocean
Fish described in 1846